This list of military legions is in chronological order where possible. In modern times, most units using the name "legion" were composed of soldiers from a specific ethnic, national, religious or ideological background, and that background is often specified in the legion's name. Since the Napoleonic Wars, many countries have used the term "legionnaire" to refer to recruits who are neither citizens nor imperial subjects of the government whose military they  enter. These governments often, but do not always, group these foreign recruits into specific units that bear the name "legion."

Ancient Rome
 List of Roman legions
 Theban Legion, a Roman legion whose members, according to a long-lasting tradition, were massacred for their Christian beliefs

18th century
 Western Legion and Eastern Legion, Greek rebel forces under Russian command in the Orlov Revolt (1770)
 Lee's Legion (1776–83), an infantry and cavalry unit of the American Continental Army
 Armand's Legion (1778–83), an American dragoon unit
 British Legion (American Revolution) (1778–83), made up of Loyalist American infantry and cavalry
 Lauzun's Legion (1778–82), a composite corps of the French Army comprising cavalry, infantry and artillery elements, mostly recruited from foreign mercenaries
 Pulaski's Legion (1778–80), one of the few cavalry regiments in the American Continental Army, later merged into Armand's Legion
 Legion of the United States (1792–96), an early United States land force commanded by Anthony Wayne
 French Revolutionary Legion of the Mississippi, a French commissioned force of Americans commanded by George Rogers Clark

French Revolutionary and Napoleonic Wars
 Légion des Allobroges, Swiss, Piedmontese, and Savoyard supporters of the French Revolution
 Batavian Legion, Dutch supporters of the French Revolution in 1793
 Belgian Legion (1792), Liégeois Legion, and Legion of Belgians and Liégeois: Belgian volunteers fighting on the side of the Republicans in the French Revolution
 Irish Legion, a French battalion established in 1803 for a future invasion of Ireland
 King's German Legion, British units of expatriate German personnel that fought against the French during the Napoleonic Wars
 La Legion Noire (The Black Legion), a military unit of the French Revolutionary Army
 Polish Legions (Napoleonic period), Polish units in the service of Napoleonic France

19th century
Belgian Legion, the name of several units of Belgian volunteers who fought in various 19th century conflicts
British Legions, foreign volunteer units, established in 1819, who fought against Spain in South America's independence wars
British German Legion, a group of German soldiers recruited to fight for Britain in the Crimean War, 1855–1856
 Greek Legion (Septinsular Republic), a Septinsular Republic unit active between 1805 and 1807, taking part in the War of the Third Coalition and the Russo-Turkish War (1806–1812)
 Royal Foreign Legion (Légion royal étrangère), infantry corps of mostly German mercenaries forming part of the restored French Bourbon army in 1815, renamed the Hohenlohe Regiment after 1821
 British Legion (1835), officially the Auxiliary Legion, a British military force sent to Spain to support the Liberals and Queen Isabella II against the Carlists in the First Carlist War
 Italian Legion, commanded by Garibaldi in the Uruguayan Civil War
 Academic Legion (Vienna), a revolutionary students' group in Vienna in 1848
 Academic Legion (Lviv), Polish nationalist students at the University of Lviv in 1848
 Greek Volunteer Legion, helping Russia in the Crimean War
 International Legion, a military force formed by Garibaldi in 1860 during the wars of Italian unification
 The British Legion (1860) British contingent of the above
 Nauvoo Legion, a significant militia in early Mormon history
 List of American Civil War legions, both Confederate and Union
 Guelphic Legion, Hanoverian paramilitary unit supporting George V, deposed king of Hanover, from 1866 to 1870
Carabinieri legions, the regional units of the Italian gendarmerie, established following the unification of the country.

20th century

World War I
 Czechoslovak Legions, Czech and Slovak volunteer forces fighting on the Allied Powers side
 French Armenian Legion, part of the French Army; also involved in the Franco-Turkish War of 1918–21
 Georgian Legion (1914–1918), a unit of the German Army recruited from Georgians 
 Infantry Regiment of the Academic Legion, formed by volunteer Polish students in 1918, later taken into the regular Polish Army
 Italian Legione Redenta, an Italian military formation that participated in the Siberian Intervention during the Russian Civil War
 Jewish Legion, in the British Army at Gallipoli and Palestine
 Polish Legion in Finland, fighting for the Finns against the Russians
 Polish Legions in World War I, part of the Austro-Hungarian Army
 Puławy Legion, a Polish formation that was part of the Imperial Russian Army
 Legion of Ukrainian Sich Riflemen, a corps of the Austro-Hungarian Army

Interwar period

 2nd Legions Infantry Division (Poland), elite unite of the Polish Army, mostly composed of veterans of the Polish Legions in World War I
 Condor Legion, a unit of "volunteers" from the German Luftwaffe serving with the Nationalists during the Spanish Civil War
 British Legion Volunteer Police Force, a short-lived police force established in response to the outcome of the Munich Agreement in September 1938
 Aviazione Legionaria, Italian air force in the Spanish civil war

World War II
 Czechoslovak Legion opposing the Germans in Poland, 1939
Note: Except for the above, all World War II legions fought on the German side.
 Free Arabian Legion, Arab volunteers, notably from Iraq, and North Africa fighting on the German side. 
 Armenian or Armenische Legion, name given to the 812th Armenian Battalion of the German Army, made up largely of Armenian Red Army prisoners of war
  (Azerbaijan legion), made up largely of Azerbaijani Red Army prisoners of war
 Blue Legion, Spanish volunteers fighting against the Soviet Union on the Eastern Front
 Crna Legija (Black Legion), the name given to the 1st and 5th Croatian Ustaše Brigades
 Croatian Legion
 Croatian Air Force Legion
 Croatian Anti-Aircraft Legion
 Croatian Naval Legion
 Estonian Legion, a unit in the Waffen SS created in 1942, mainly consisting of Estonian soldiers
 Flemish Legion (Dutch: Vlaams Legioen), recruited among Dutch-speaking volunteers from German-occupied Belgium, notably from Flanders. 
 Walloon Legion (French: Légion Wallonie), recruited among French-speaking volunteers from German-occupied Belgium.
 Légion française des combattants (French Legion of Fighters), a pro-Nazi Vichy French unit
 Legion of French Volunteers Against Bolshevism (LVF), pro-Nazi French
 Georgian Legion (1941–1945), a unit of the German army recruited from Georgians
 Indische Legion, also known as the Free India Legion or Tiger Legion, an Indian unit raised in 1941 and attached to the German Army
 Latvian Legion, a formation of the Waffen-SS created in 1943 and consisting primarily of ethnic Latvians
 Legion of St. George, the original name of the British Free Corps
 Ostlegionen (literally "Eastern Legions"), conscripts and volunteers from the occupied eastern territories recruited into the German Army 
 La Légion Tricolore, a pro-Nazi French unit which was absorbed into the LVF after six months
 Volga Tatar Legion, one of several units formed by the Wehrmacht out of Soviet prisoners of war according to their ethnicity

Other
 Arab Legion (al-Jaysh al-Arabī) (1920–56), the regular army of Transjordan, predecessor of the present Jordanian Army
 Foreign legion (disambiguation)
 French Foreign Legion, a unit of the French Army mainly composed of foreigners wishing to fight for France (1831–present)
 Polish Legions (disambiguation), eleven units at different times between the 18th and 20th centuries (some of which are listed separately above)
 Spanish Legion, an elite unit of the Spanish Army (1920–present)

21st century 

 International Legion of Territorial Defence of Ukraine, a volunteer foreign legion military unit created by the Government of Ukraine to fight in the 2022 Russian invasion of Ukraine

See also
 National Legion, a far right Belgian paramilary and political movement in the 1920s and 1930s, headed by Paul Hoornaert
  Légion Belge, a far right but anti-Nazi World War II Belgian Resistance movement
 White Legion, a Georgian guerrilla group in Abkhazia after the Georgian regular army's defeat in the War in Abkhazia
 Caribbean Legion, active in Central American politics of the 1950s

References

External links

Legions